Athina Papayianni (also Papagianni, born August 18, 1980) is a Greek race walker. She was sixth at the 2005 World Championships in Athletics in Helsinki.

Achievements

References

1980 births
Living people
Sportspeople from Preveza
Greek female racewalkers
Athletes (track and field) at the 2000 Summer Olympics
Athletes (track and field) at the 2004 Summer Olympics
Olympic athletes of Greece